Pieniny National Park may refer to two national parks in the Pieniny Mountains:
 Pieniny National Park (Poland)
 Pieniny National Park (Slovakia)